Piet de Zoete (born 6 November 1943) is a Dutch footballer. He played in three matches for the Netherlands national football team from 1966 to 1967.

References

External links
 

1943 births
Living people
Dutch footballers
Netherlands international footballers
Footballers from The Hague
Association footballers not categorized by position